The Polska Hokej Liga (PHL) is the premier ice hockey league in Poland. Previously, it was known as the I Liga or Ekstraklasa from 1926 to 1999, and the Polska Liga Hokejowa from 1999 to 2013. In 2013, it was reorganized as a limited liability company and renamed the Polska Hokej Liga. It follows a system of relegation to and promotion to/from the Polish 1. Liga.

Teams from the PHL can participate in the IIHF's annual Champions Hockey League (CHL), competing for the European Trophy. Participation is based on the strength of the various leagues in Europe (excluding the European/Asian Kontinental Hockey League). Going into the 2022–23 CHL season, the PHL was ranked the No. 12 league in Europe, allowing them to send their top team to compete in the CHL.

History 
The championship started in 1925-26. At first, it was a non-league system composed of regional tournaments. The tournaments had two stages. The best teams qualified to the final tournament, of which the winner was declared champion. In 1938, the Polish Ice Hockey Federation decided to reorganize the championship, by creating a league system. Those plans were abandoned due to the outbreak of World War II.

The current structure of the league began in 1955.

2021–22 teams

Medalists

See also 
 Polish Cup (ice hockey)

External links 
 Polska Hokej Liga website
 Polish Ice Hockey Federation website
 hokej.net
 planetofhockey.com

 
Top tier ice hockey leagues in Europe
Professional ice hockey leagues in Poland